Saint-Menges is a commune in the Ardennes department in northern France.

It lies northwest of Sedan, near the border with Belgium.

Population

See also
Communes of the Ardennes department

References

Communes of Ardennes (department)
Ardennes communes articles needing translation from French Wikipedia